Hirooki (written: 広宙 or 洋央紀) is a masculine Japanese given name. Notable people with the name include:

, Japanese racewalker
, Japanese professional wrestler

See also
Hiroki

Japanese masculine given names